The following is a list of awards and nominations received by American actress and producer Julia Roberts throughout her career.

Film Awards
The following is a list of awards and nominations received by Julia Roberts for her work in film.

Industry Awards

Academy Awards

British Academy of Film and Television Arts Film Awards

Critics’ Choice Awards

Golden Globe Awards

Independent Spirit Awards

Screen Actors Guild Awards

Popular Awards

Blockbuster Entertainment Awards

Empire Awards

MTV Movie Awards

Nickelodeon Kids’ Choice Awards

People's Choice Awards

Teen Choice Awards

Critics’ Groups Awards

Boston Society of Film Critics Association

Chicago Film Critics Association

Dallas–Fort Worth Film Critics Association

Detroit Film Critics Society

London Film Critics’ Circle

Los Angeles Film Critics Association

National Board of Review

Online Film Critics Society

San Diego Film Critics Society

Washington D.C. Area Film Critics Association

Women Film Critics Circle

Other Film Awards

Alliance of Women Film Journalists Awards

Australian Academy of Cinema and Television Arts Awards

Satellite Awards

Saturn Awards

Young Artist Awards

Academy Museum of Motion Pictures

George Eastman

Film Festival Awards

Hollywood Film Festival

Palm Springs International Film Festival

Theater Awards
The following is a list of awards and nominations received by Julia Roberts for her work in theater.

Industry Awards

Drama League Awards

Television Awards
The following is a list of awards and nominations received by Julia Roberts for her work in television.

Industry Awards

Critics’ Choice Awards

Emmy Awards (Primetime)

Golden Globe Awards

Screen Actors Guild Awards

References

Roberts, Julia
Awards